The 1996 IIHF European U18 Championship was the twenty-ninth playing of the IIHF European Junior Championships.

Group A
Played April 7 to the 14th, in Ufa, Russia.

First round 
Because of Germany's success in the previous year, the draw for this year's championship guaranteed a final four berth for either Germany, Switzerland or Belarus.  Group 1 was made up of the teams that finished 1st, 4th, 5th, and the newly promoted country, Group 2 contained 2nd, 3rd, 6th, and 7th.  Unfortunately, this meant that Slovakia's first time playing at the top level, they would face Finland, Russia, and the Czech Republic, in the first round.  The Swiss made the most of their opportunity, becoming just the seventh nation to finish in the top four.
Group 1

Group 2

Final round
On the final day the Russians and the Finns both won to finish tied for first, and since they had tied each other, it came down to goal differential in the final round.  Both teams beat the Swedes by three goals, but Russia's seven goal margin against the Swiss clinched the gold.
Championship round

Placing round
On the final day of competition, Slovakia avenged their surprising loss in 1993, by beating, and in effect relegating, Belarus.

Belarus was relegated to Group B for 1997.

Tournament Awards
Top Scorer  Marco Sturm (11 points)
Top Goalie: Adam Svoboda
Top Defenceman:Andrei Zyuzin
Top Forward: Marcus Nilson

Group B 
Played from March 23 to the 29th, in Tychy and Sosnowiec, Poland.

First round 
Group 1

Group 2

Final round
Championship round

Placing round

Ukraine was promoted to Group A and Romania was relegated to Group C, for 1997.

Group C 
Played from March 15 to 19, in Maribor, Slovenia.

First round 
Group 1

Group 2

Placing round

Slovenia was promoted to Group B and Spain was relegated to Group D, for 1997.

Group D 
Played from March 6 to 10 in Sofia, Bulgaria.

First round 
Group 1

Group 2

The Greek team did not have the minimum required number of players, and were disqualified.  However, they still played their games against Israel and Yugoslavia as exhibition matches.  They also played an exhibition game against fifth place Turkey, defeating them seven to five.

Placing round 

The Netherlands was promoted to Group C for 1997.

References

Complete results

Junior
1996
International ice hockey competitions hosted by Russia
Sport in Ufa
Junior
April 1996 sports events in Europe
Sosnowiec
Sport in Tychy
Junior
International ice hockey competitions hosted by Poland
March 1996 sports events in Europe
Sport in Maribor
International ice hockey competitions hosted by Slovenia
Junior
Junior
International ice hockey competitions hosted by Bulgaria
Sports competitions in Sofia
1996 IIHF European U18 Championship